The Millais Baronetcy, of Palace Gate in Kensington in the County of Middlesex and of St Ouen in Jersey, is a title in the Baronetage of the United Kingdom. It was created on 16 July 1885 for the painter and illustrator John Everett Millais. He was one of the founders of the Pre-Raphaelite Brotherhood. As of 2014 the title is held by his great-grandson, the sixth Baronet, who succeeded his father in 1992.

Millais baronets, of Palace Gate and St Quen (1885)
Sir John Everett Millais, 1st Baronet (1829–1896)
Sir Everett Millais, 2nd Baronet (1856–1897)
Sir John Everett Millais, 3rd Baronet (1888–1920)
Sir Geoffroy William Millais, 4th Baronet (1863–1941)
Sir Ralph Regnault Millais, 5th Baronet (1905–1992)
Sir Geoffroy Richard Everett Millais, 6th Baronet (born 1941)

The heir presumptive to the baronetcy is John Frederic Millais b. 1949, cousin of the 6th Baronet.

References

Millais
Millais family